The Kansas City Scouts were a professional ice hockey team based in Kansas City, Missouri. They were members of the Smythe Division in the Clarence Campbell Conference of the National Hockey League (NHL). The Scouts participated in 3 NHL Amateur Drafts, where participating teams select newly eligible players in a predefined order, and drafted 26 players.

Key
 Played at least one game with the Scouts
 Spent entire NHL career with the Scouts

Draft picks

See also
List of Kansas City Scouts players
1974 NHL Expansion Draft
List of Colorado Rockies draft picks
List of New Jersey Devils draft picks

References

 
 

 
draft picks
Kansas City Scouts